In sport, some national and club teams include one or more stars as part of (or beside) the team badge (often referred to as a "crest") appearing on their kits, often on the shirts, to represent important achievements for the team's history. Generally inspired by the star symbol in heraldry, since the late 1950s, when it was introduced for the first time in association football, various national governing bodies at club level and some confederations have also regulated the practice.

Fédération Internationale de Football Association (FIFA), at an international level, was the first federation to regulate the addition of stars to crests in recognition of a significant number of titles in a specific competition, such as league tournaments, confederations' continental championships, club world titles and the FIFA World Cup. Due to the positive reception in the public opinion, it was subsequently introduced in other disciplines, mostly in team sports, but also in e-sports.

Standardised significance
The first team in sports history to adopt a star was Juventus, who added one golden star with five points in the team's shirt, after Italian Football Federation (FIGC) approval, in 1958 to represent their tenth Italian Football Championship and Serie A title, at the time, the new national record. This was an extension of the existing convention by which the reigning champions are entitled to display the scudetto on their shirts for the following season.

Juventus unofficially won their 30th league title in 2011–12, but a dispute with the Italian Football Federation, who stripped Juventus of their 2004–05 title and did not assign to them the 2005–06 title due to their involvement in a 2006 Italian football scandal, left their official total at 28. However, they elected to wear no stars at all the following season. Juventus won their 30th title in 2013–14 and thus earned the right to wear their third star, however, club president Andrea Agnelli stated that the club suspended the use of the stars until another team wins their 20th championship, thus having the right to wear two stars, "to emphasise the difference". However, for the 2015–16 season, Juventus reintroduced the stars and added the third star to their jersey as well with new kit manufacturers Adidas.

In Scotland, Rangers displayed five stars above the badge on their shirts in 2003 to symbolize their 50 league titles. Celtic, who also have more than 50 league titles, have one star above their badge to represent their triumph in the 1967 European Cup. Aberdeen displayed two stars to commemorate their 1980s wins in the European Cup Winners' Cup and European Super Cup.

Germany has two official star systems operating in parallel. In 2004, the DFL, which governs the Bundesliga (the top two divisions), introduced Verdiente Meistervereine (roughly "distinguished champion clubs").  This has a sliding scale of 1, 2, 3, 4 and 5 stars for 3, 5, 10, 20 and 30 titles. It includes only Bundesliga titles, excluding titles from before the formation of the Bundesliga in 1963, and from the former East German League. Dynamo Berlin (playing in the fourth level) unilaterally began wearing three unapproved stars for its East German titles. In November 2005, the DFB, which governs non-Bundesliga football, allowed former champions playing outside the Bundesliga to display a single star inscribed with the number of titles. In 2007, Dynamo Berlin switched to a single approved star inscribed with the number 10. Greuther Fürth retains three silver stars on its club badge to celebrate three pre-Bundesliga titles, but the stars are not featured on its shirts.

Major League Soccer's previously informal system, one star per MLS Cup title, was standardized in 2006, with the defending champions wearing the MLS Scudetto, like the Serie A system, for one season before adding a new star. Starting in 2012, the Scudetto was replaced with a single gold star worn by reigning champions above any other silver championship stars. In 2016, this system changed again in recognition of the LA Galaxy's fifth championship title: champion clubs during their title defence wore an oversized gold star (featuring the year of the league win) above other smaller stars set in silver; clubs with five championships (presently only the Galaxy) will wear one gold star; and teams with one-to-four MLS Cup wins will wear one silver star for each victory. In 2020 the system was changed again with the defending champion receiving a silver star and wearing a redesigned MLS scudetto on their sleeve for the following season.

In Australia, they also use a system based around different coloured stars for different trophy wins: Australian winners of the AFC Champions League will wear a gold star inscribed with the number of wins, while A-League and W-League victory is recognised with a silver star similarly embossed; reigning league or FFA Cup champions will also wear a gold competition emblem in the season following the championship.

Occasionally, stars are added to badges of successor or phoenix clubs for the achievements of defunct predecessors. An example of this is the Tampa Bay Rowdies. They added a star to represent the Soccer Bowl, the championship of the original NASL, won by the original Tampa Bay Rowdies in 1975. The club has since added a second star, after the new club won the 2012 edition of the resurrected Soccer Bowl in the new NASL, and kept both stars upon joining the USL Championship. MLS teams who won titles in other leagues prior to joining the MLS do not retain the stars worn by the old clubs when they joined the MLS. In the case of the Impact, the new team paid tribute to the former team's first title through the stripes on their badge.

As well as predecessor clubs, victories in the national leagues of defunct countries have also been represented by stars. FC Dynamo Kyiv have two stars, commemorating championships won in the Soviet and Ukrainian football league systems. The same is true of Belgrade clubs Partizan and Red Star who have won titles in Yugoslavia, Serbia and Montenegro and present-day Serbia, while Spartak Moscow's four stars for every five league titles refer to their 22 Soviet Top League and Russian Football Premier League titles.

The star has given rise to a byword to winning trophies. Examples of this include when Fawaz Al-Hasawi, then owner of English side Nottingham Forest, was quoted as saying "maybe [Nottingham Forest] will have a third star", in reference to Forest's two European Cups; and France international Paul Pogba's comments when asked about stars in the days before the 2018 FIFA World Cup Final: "Croatia do not have stars – they want one. They have done very well and they want the victory, like us. But I do not have a star. It's on the shirt, but I did not win it. We want to go looking for it like all players."

International

Brazil had two stars above their badge in 1968. It was used briefly (friendly matches only) and then removed. After winning their third World Cup in 1970, three stars were officially added and Italy did likewise in 1982. Germany added three in 1996, one in each of the German flag's colours. All world champions have since followed suit. Brazil, Italy, and Germany have since added more stars, after they won later tournaments, while Argentina are the most recent nation to add a star, commemorating their 2022 triumph less than an hour after victory in the Final.

Uruguay display four stars, including their triumphs in the 1924 and 1928 Olympics, which are regarded as FIFA amateur world championships by the governing body. The 1924 FIFA Congress ruled, "on condition that the Olympic Football Tournament takes place in accordance with the Regulations of FIFA, the latter shall recognize this as a world football championship", and the 1924 and 1928 championships are regarded as equivalent to World Cups in the 1984 Official History of FIFA.

In the equipment regulations for FIFA competitions, section 16.1 states, "Those Member Associations that have won one or more of the previous editions of the FIFA World Cup or the FIFA Women's World Cup may display on the Playing Equipment used by their first men's or women's representative teams a five-pointed star, or other symbol as instructed by FIFA, per edition of the FIFA World Cup (men's shirt) or FIFA Women's World Cup (women's shirt) won by the Member Association." The form of symbol is now specified, the accompanying illustrative example depicts a gold star.

Some national teams, especially ones in Africa, wear stars for winning continental competitions. For example, Egypt has seven stars above their badge for their seven Africa Cup of Nations wins, but these stars can only be worn during continental competitions, not FIFA competitions.

Ad hoc adoptions
More recently, club teams have added stars either upon winning a landmark trophy, or in response to a rival team's having added stars. In the Romanian first league, Steaua uses 2 stars above their badge since they won their 20th title. Since then Dinamo added a star for the 18 championships they won. Manchester United sported a star in their UEFA Champions League matches on their special European home kit between 1997 and 1999. To celebrate their second victory that year, they added an extra star to that kit for the 1999–00 season. Liverpool likewise wore four stars in 2001–02, their first campaign in the competition since the Heysel Stadium disaster in 1985. They wore five stars in the competition in 2005–06 after their fifth victory. Instead of stars, UEFA introduced a multiple winner badge in 2000–01 season, currently worn by five teams who have won the Champions League either five times or more in total, or three times in a row.

Occasionally, stars are temporarily added for one season, usually to commemorative kits to celebrate the anniversary of a particular event in the club's history. Burnley sported two stars on their 2006–07 shirt, for the club's 125th anniversary, to celebrate their two league titles in 1921 and 1960. Likewise Bury in 2009–10, also for their 125th anniversary, commemorating their 1900 and 1903 FA Cup triumphs; Bury have since revived the stars, from 2011 to 2012, after a season's absence. Commemorating anniversaries in this way is not confined to English clubs: Peruvian side Universitario celebrated their 90th anniversary by adding 26 stars to their kits worn home and away. This is not a practice limited to clubs, as in 2004, Denmark wore a star on their shirts specially for Euro 2004, to commemorate their victory in the competition in 1992.

In women's football, the emerging ad hoc standard is to wear stars on the sleeve instead of above the badge. Two of the four teams that have won the FIFA Women's World Cup to date – Norway and Germany – use this practice, as did three-time Women's World Cup winners, the USA, until moving the stars to the back collar in 2007. The United States has returned its stars to above the badge on their new uniforms for the 2011 Women's World Cup, and have added a third and fourth star since their 2015 and 2019 FIFA Women's World Cup championships.

Boca Juniors of Argentina are noted for adding a star to their official badge for every major trophy won in the club's history, and currently have over 70 stars. However, the badge on the club shirts only features 52 stars due to space.

The practice of using stars to signify major titles has spread to other football codes, and to unrelated sports. For example, in 2009, Meath senior Gaelic football team began wearing seven stars on their jerseys, signifying their seven All-Ireland Senior Football Championships. In rugby union, Toulon added a star above its badge after winning the Heineken Cup in 2013, added a second star immediately after winning the same competition in 2014 and a third after winning the inaugural European Rugby Champions Cup in 2015; English rugby union side Saracens F.C. also added 3 stars on their shirt while Leinster Rugby added 4 stars.. English rugby union side Sale Sharks wear a gold star in tribute to their sole Premiership title. In basketball, the men's team of Indiana University Bloomington added five stars to its shorts, representing its five NCAA championships, for the 2015 NCAA tournament, and made the stars at that location a permanent fixture for the 2015–16 season. The Los Angeles Lakers of the National Basketball Association have 17 stars around the logo at center court for their 17 league titles, but do not wear stars on their uniforms.

Other than stars, Royal Engineers A.F.C. adopted the FA Cup as their badge. Clapham Rovers badge written with "F.A. Cup winners 1880". F.C. Vado integrated the symbol of the Coppa Italia, the Coccarda, into their badge. Mercedes AMG Petronas F1 Team adopted Mercedes-Benz logo, Xelajú MC adopted crescents above their crest, NCAA basketball teams sponsored by Nike adopted a golden or silver patch while NBA team wear golden patch on the back collar with their number of titles won.

List in football

Excluding the temporary stars, the following teams have chosen to add stars to their shirts:

National teams

Intercontinental (Men) (Football)

Intercontinental (Men) (Futsal)

Currently, Brazil, Germany, Italy, England, Uruguay use the same logo as in football.

Continental (Men) (Futsal)

Intercontinental (Men) (AMF Futsal)

Intercontinental (Women) (AMF Futsal)

Intercontinental (Men) (Beach soccer)

Continental (football)
Currently team jersey feature star which represent continental champion does not necessary feature in FIFA tournament. However this is only feature during World Cup qualifiers, continental competition and friendly match.

Intercontinental (non-FIFA football)

Intercontinental (Women)

Note: Some women's teams, such as Argentina, Italy, Uruguay and Brazil, wear the men's stars on their jersey but England, France and Spain does not wear the star.

Continental (Women)

Football clubs

OFC

AFC

AFC (Japanese boys Secondary School)

AFC (Japanese boys High School)

AFC (Japanese University)

CAF

Notes

CONCACAF (United States)

CONCACAF (United States college soccer)

CONCACAF (United States high school)

CONCACAF

CONCACAF (Mexico)

CONIFA North America & Caribbean

CONMEBOL (Argentina)

CONMEBOL

CONMEBOL (Brazil states champions)

CONMEBOL (Brazil nationwide and international)

UEFA

UEFA (Greek team which wearing Greek FA logo with star)

UEFA (Former German national champions which did not win three Bundesliga title)

Northern Cyprus

Beach Soccer (UEFA)

AFC Futsal

CONMEBOL Futsal

UEFA Futsal

CONCACAF (Indoor soccer)

CONMEBOL (Women)

CONMEBOL (Women futsal)

CONCACAF (Women)

CONCACAF (Women college soccer)

AFC (Women)

CAF (Women)

UEFA (Women)

List in other sports

National teams

Intercontinental (field hockey)

Note: Unlike in football which women's teams will adopt men's star on their jersey, Belgium women's national field hockey team does not wear the men's stars on their jersey.

Intercontinental (badminton)

Intercontinental (men's handball)

Intercontinental (women's handball)

Intercontinental (cricket)

Sport clubs adopt same logo as football
While the club logo with star usually represent football major trophy, the same logo applied to other sport department as well.

Recreation Club

Table tennis

Rugby union

Basketball

NCAA

Rest of the world

Handball

Handball (men)

Gaelic football

Handball (Women)

Ice hockey

Field hockey

Field hockey (men)

Field hockey (women)

Baseball

Volleyball

Men's volleyball

Women's volleyball

Cricket

Esports

League of Legends

Counter-Strike: Global Offensive

Dota 2

Rocket League

Sports teams who only wearing stars for temporary or removed

National teams

Men
Intercontinental (football)

Football club

AFC

CAF

CONCACAF

CONMEBOL

UEFA

Ice hockey

F1

Rugby Union

Esports

League of Legends

Rocket League

Stars not signifying particular titles
American club Philadelphia Union has 13 stars that represent the 13 original colonies of the United States. Fellow Major League Soccer franchise Montreal Impact had four stars on their badge, which were symbolic of the nationalities of the peoples who founded the city of Montreal, prior to rebranding as CF Montreal. The four nations are regularly used in Montreal imagery, as the city flag and coat of arms both reference them. Minnesota United FC, who also play in Major League Soccer feature a star on their crest representing L'Étoile du Nord, the official motto of the state of Minnesota and the source of the state nickname, The North Star State.

The badge of Peñarol of Uruguay has 11 stars for the 11 players.

The badge introduced by Manchester City in 1997 had three stars to give it a "more continental feel". The 3 stars do not represent titles or trophies. City brought in a new club badge in 2016 with no stars on it. Sivasspor of Turkey also has three stars on their badge. They do not represent any championships either.

Portsmouth F.C. has featured a star (of various designs) in its badge since 1913.  The star does not represent trophies or titles won, instead, the Portsmouth badge was based upon symbols found in the official coat of arms owned by Portsmouth City Council.

For the 2002–03 season, the badge of Greek club Panathinaikos F.C. had 3 stars.  One gold representing the team's partaking in the 1971 European Cup Final, and 2 white stars representing the team's participation at the 1985 European Cup semi-finals and the 1996 UEFA Champions League semi-finals respectively. Because none of these stars represent titles or trophies, opposition fans in Greece mocked this.

Following the crash of LaMia Flight 2933, Brazilian club Chapecoense incorporated a star into its badge as a tribute to those who perished in the incident.

Yeovil Town added three stars above its crest for 2017–18, for every five seasons they have remained in the English Football League.

Forest Green Rovers added three stars to the back of the neck area for 2018–19, to denote progression in the EFL. One star is coloured for promotion to League Two and the other two are faded until they reach the Championship.

Notes

References

Sports culture
Sports symbols
Sports terminology